Mount McQuillan is a mountain on Vancouver Island, British Columbia, Canada, located  southeast of Port Alberni and  south of Mount Arrowsmith.

See also
 List of mountains in Canada

References

Vancouver Island Ranges
McQuillan